Didgori is an administrative district (raioni) in Tbilisi, capital of Georgia.

References 

Districts of Tbilisi